Mathieu "Mat" Trésarrieu (born 2 March 1986) is a French motorcycle speedway rider who competes in Speedway, Longtrack and Grasstrack. He is a two times World Longtrack Champion and is a three-time speedway champion of France.

Biography
Trésarrieu was born in Bordeaux in 1986, and took up speedway at the age of twelve. His two older brothers Stéphane and Sebastien are also speedway riders. He won the French national championship for the first time in 2002. Between 2002 and 2003 he rode for the Isle of Wight Islanders in seven matches, but only got a regular league place in 2005 when he rode in forty matches for Reading Racers at an average score of 5.6. 

In 2006 he moved on to Redcar Bears, where he stayed for two seasons, averaging over seven in each. He won the French title for a second time in 2007, and (after missing the 2008 season through injury) for a third time in 2009. He also finished third in the Individual Speedway Long Track World Championship in 2007. He returned to British speedway in 2010 in the Elite League with Peterborough Panthers, but failed to get a starting place at the start of the 2011 season. An injury to Ilya Bondarenko gave him an opportunity with Leicester Lions, and later in 2011 he signed for Ipswich Witches to replace the injured Chris Schramm, riding as part of the team that won the Premier League Four-Team Championship at Leicester.

Mat re-joined Ipswich in 2012, electing to focus on speedway, rather than grass and long track racing.

In 2022, he won his second World Longtrack title, finishing 28 points clear of Zach Wajtknecht in the 2022 Individual Long Track World Championship.

World Longtrack Championship

Grand-Prix Series

Best results
  Forssa Third 2016
  Herxheim First 2019, Second 2014, 2017
  La Reole First 2007, 2018
  Marmande First 2007, Third 2011
  Morizes Second 2009, 2013, 2014, 2015, 2016, 2019, 2020
  Mühldorf Third 2017, 2018, 2019
  Vechta Second 2009, 2010
  St. Macaire Third 2006
  Roden Second 2018
  Eenrum Second 2018

European Grasstrack Championship
Finals

 2003  La Reole (NSR)
 2004  Eenrum (18th) 6pts
 2006  La Reole (NS)
 2007  Folkestone (NS)
 2013  Bielefeld (10th) 12pts
 2014  St. Macaire (5th) 17pts
 2016  Folkestone (Second) 19pts
 2017  Hertingen (16th) 3pts
 2018  Tayac (5th) 16pts
 2019  Bad Hersfeld (10th) 12pts
 2020  Tayac (First) 19pts

References

External links
 https://grasstrackgb.co.uk/mathieu-tresarrieu/

1986 births
Living people
French speedway riders
Reading Racers riders
Redcar Bears riders
Peterborough Panthers riders
Leicester Lions riders
Ipswich Witches riders
Individual Speedway Long Track World Championship riders
Sportspeople from Bordeaux